Adam Parr (born 26 May 1965) is a British businessman known for his work in various fields including Formula 1 and investment to NGOs. He is the former CEO and chairman of Williams Grand Prix Holdings PLC, from November 2006 until 30 March 2012. Parr began his career working for BZW and moved to Rio Tinto before studying and practising public law. He later returned to Rio Tinto as assistant to the Chief Executive and chairman before being appointed CEO of Williams F1 in 2006. Since leaving Williams in 2012, Parr has completed a PhD in eighteenth-century history and literature at University College London; and been involved in business and not-for-profit activities. He is a director of Cosworth Limited and the River Learning Trust.

Early life and education
Parr was born in London as Adam Stephen de Voghelaere Parr in 1965. He attended Jesus College, Cambridge, graduating in 1987.

Career history

Parr began his career with the investment bank Barclays de Zoete Wedd. Having spent some time in Japan before university, his interest in the country led him to Japanese equities and trading. He was relocated to Japan as an equities analyst focusing on heavy industrial sectors such as iron and steel. In Japan he became acquainted with Anglo-Australian mining group Rio Tinto and, on his return to the UK, was seconded to Rio Tinto by BZW to help with mergers and acquisitions. He then joined Rio Tinto full-time, firstly as personal assistant to the head of exploration and then as assistant to the general manager of the Palabora copper mine in South Africa.

Parr took an extended sabbatical to study Law. At the Bar, he practised in the areas of public law, appearing in cases up to the Court of Appeal. He successfully represented the former chief executive of Westminster City Council, in his appeal against a £30 million fine in the Dame Shirley Porter "gerrymandering" case.

Rio Tinto
In 1998 Parr returned to Rio Tinto as assistant to the chairman and chief executive. His main focus was to improve industrial safety in Rio Tinto's operations. Following a global study, he helped establish a safety programme for the Group's 30,000 staff.

Over the following years injuries fell significantly. Parr then took up a series of increasingly senior executive posts during six years in Australia, firstly managing Rio Tinto's extensive port and infrastructure in the remote Pilbara region, then running its Western Australian salt operations. Finally, he served as president and chief commercial officer of Rio Tinto Minerals, a group with operations in Europe, the Americas, Australia and Asia. Parr first met Frank Williams in 2000.

Williams F1
In November 2006 Parr was appointed chief executive officer of Williams F1, replacing departing CEO Chris Chapple.
Parr was chairman of Williams Grand Prix Engineering Limited from July 2010 to March 2012, responsible for the day-to-day running of the team, whilst Frank Williams remained Team Principal and majority shareholder of the company. Parr was known during his tenure for his green innovation – bringing hybrid technology to the fore of Williams.

Cosworth
In January 2014, he was appointed to the Board of Cosworth, a high performance engineering firm based in Northampton.

Graphic memoir
Parr has released a graphic memoir, entitled The Art of War: Five Years in Formula One, detailing his time as CEO of Williams F1.

Sported
Parr was named chief executive of Sported in April 2013. The foundation was set up in 2008 by Sir Keith Mills, donating £10 million to inspire disadvantaged young people. Following the London 2012 Summer Olympics, Sported became "the UK's leading sports foundation dedicated to securing the legacy of London 2012" He stood down as chief executive of Sported at the end of 2013 but remains a member of the fundraising committee.

The Walk Free Foundation
Adam Parr also briefly worked with the Walk Free Foundation, which aims to eliminate modern slavery by 2020.

Oxford Semantic Technologies
Parr founded the tech startup Oxford Semantic Technologies in 2017 alongside Professors Ian Horrocks, Bernardo Cuenca Grau, and Boris Motik of the University of Oxford.

References

External links
 

Living people
1965 births
Alumni of Jesus College, Cambridge
British expatriates in Australia
British expatriates in Japan
British investment bankers
Businesspeople from London
People educated at Eton College